Ellsberg is a surname. Notable people with the surname include:

 Daniel Ellsberg (born 1931), American military analyst and whistleblower
 Edward Ellsberg (1891–1983), American military writer
 Mary Carroll Ellsberg, American epidemiologist
 Michael Ellsberg (born 1977), American author
 Robert Ellsberg (born 1955), American non-fiction writer

See also
 Ellsberg paradox
 Nathaniel A. Elsberg (1872–1932), New York politician